Nikolaos Arvanitidis (Greek: Νικόλαος  Αρβανιτίδης; 21 August 1976), better known by his stage name Nikos Vertis (Greek: Νίκος Βέρτης) is a popular Greek singer. He was born in Gorinchem, Netherlands and his origin is from Galipsos village, near Kavala. To date, he has released five studio albums along with one CD single, and two special edition CD/DVD albums.

Career

Early life
The son of Argyris Arvanitidis and Morfoula Arvanitidi, at the age of six, Vertis and his family moved to Thessaloniki, Greece and at seven, he started playing the Bouzouki. By the age of 15, he started getting involved with singing. At age 16, he moved back to the Netherlands for two years, where he attended a technical high school. He returned to Greece for his military duties, and once completed started getting involved with his love of singing. He started singing in small clubs in Thessaloniki and other locations around the region of Macedonia. In the summer of 2002, he started singing at the popular club "Rodon" where he made a big impact, and continued singing there until summer 2003.

2003-2004: Poli Apotoma Vradiazei & Pame Psihi Mou
In 2003, Vertis signed with Universal Music Greece and released his debut album titled Poli Apotoma Vradiazei (Night comes too fast). The songs "Asteri Mou", "An Feigeis", "San Trelos Se Agapao" and the title track "Poli Apotoma Vradiazei" became radio hits in a short time, while Peggy Zina lent her voice for two duets on the album titled "Eimaste Horia" and "Hanomaste" which were also radio hits. For the winter season of 2003-2004, Vertis moved to Athens, Greece where he collaborated with Peggy Zina at club Apollon. At the third annual "Arion Awards" in 2003, Vertis won the award for "Best New Artist".

In May 2004, Vertis started singing at club "Rodon" in Thessaloniki again, in successful shows until August. In September 2004, he released his second album Pame Psihi Mou (Lets go my soul) with songs by Giorgos Theofanos. The songs "Pos Tolmas", "Thimamai", and "Se Mena" become radio hits. At the same time, Vertis started performing at club "Posidonio" for the winter season of 2004-2005. His performances at "Posidonio" were highly successfully, with some calling him "The next big Laiko singer". At the fourth annual "Arion Music Awards" in 2004, Vertis was nominated in the category "Best Male Laiko Singer".

2005-2006: Pes To Mou Ksana & Pos Pernao Ta Vradia Monos

In the spring of 2005, he started his second round of performances at club "Posidonio" where he remained for the whole summer.  In the summer of 2005, he released his first CD single titled "Pes To Mou Ksana" (Tell me again), which was certified Platinum and awarded the "Best-selling Greek Single of the Year" at the fifth Arion Awards.

For the winter season 2005-2006 he continued singing at club Posidonio. In December 2005, Vertis released his third album, "Pos Perno Ta Vradia Monos" (How I pass the evenings alone). The CD featured music by Kiriakos Papadopoulos with lyrics by Ilias Filippou. The album was quickly certified Platinum, while the songs "Pes To Mou Ksana", "Poia Esu", "Pos Na To Exigiso", "Den Se Niazei", and "Kapote Tha Deis" become radio hits. In the beginning of 2006, Vertis re-released the album as a special edition with a bonus DVD featuring seven music videos.

2007–present: Mono Gia Sena and Ola Einai Edo

For the winter season of 2006-2007, Vertis sang again at club "Posidonion".  In March, he started recording his fourth studio album, titled Mono Gia Sena (Only for you), which was released in April 2007 and included a bonus DVD.  From the album, the songs "Mono Gia Sena", "Matia Mou Glyka", "Parapono Mou", "Svista Ola" and "De M'Agapas" became instant radio hits and charted throughout the summer. In July 2007, the album was certified platinum, and became double platinum by February 2008. For the winter season of 2007-2008, Vertis sang for the fourth year in a row at club "Posidonion", ending on 14 January 2008. The final night was filled with guest appearances by fellow singers and friends such as Antonis Remos, George Dalaras, Antonis Vardis, and other celebrities. In October 2008, Vertis began a world tour of twenty concerts in Australia, Israel, the United States, Canada, and Europe, ending on 17 January 2009 at the HMV Hammersmith Apollo in London.

Vertis' fifth studio album Ola Einai Edo (Everything is here) was originally announced to be a February 2009 release, but was finally released in early April. The twelve-track album was written by Christos Nikolopoulos, Antonis Vardis, and Dimitris Dekos. It was released in three versions: a standard twelve-track album in a jewel case, an edition in a rectangular box with a bonus "Mega-Mix" CD of thirteen of Vertis' greatest hits, and a version that includes a magazine. As part of Universal Music's promotional campaign, a digipak edition with a fixed price of €9.90 was also released, notable for being about half of what the average new album is priced at in the Greek market. The first single "Den Teliosame" was released to radios in early April and is an erotic ballad; a music video was created and was directed by Giorgos Gabalos. The album was certified Platinum quickly, and later certified 4× Platinum.

Discography

Poli Apotoma Vradiazei (2003)
Pame Psichi Mou (2004)
Pos Perno Ta Vradia Monos (2005)
Mono Gia Sena (2007)
Ola Einai Edo (2009)
Eimai Mazi Sou (2011)
Protaseis (2013)
Nikos Vertis Live Tour – 10 Chronia (2014)
Nikos Vertis (2015)
Erotevmenos (2017)

References

External links

 Official Fan Club
 MP3greek.gr Fan Club
 Nikos Vertis Discography and Lyrics

1976 births
Living people
21st-century Greek male singers
Greek pop singers
Greek laïko singers
MAD Video Music Awards winners
Universal Music Greece artists
People from Gorinchem
Dutch emigrants to Greece
Singers from Thessaloniki